Jeff Spiers (born 2 May 1967) is a Northern Irish retired footballer and coach, who is currently assistant manager at NIFL Premiership side Crusaders.

Jeff started out with Barn United before signing for Linfield, where he won virtually every domestic honour possible, before signing for Glenavon, Bangor, and Crusaders, where he was appointed captain and was instrumental in the Crues rise into the Premier League as they won almost all intermediate trophies. Appointed at the start of the 2007/2008 season, Jeff was appointed manager of Crusaders Reserves team. He is now assistant manager of the first team at the club to Stephen Baxter.

References 

Association footballers from Northern Ireland
Crusaders F.C. players
1967 births
Living people
Association footballers not categorized by position
Linfield F.C. players
Glenavon F.C. players
Bangor F.C. players